Scavas is the name of sports cars designed by Greek engineer Vassilios Scavas that were never industrially produced.

After gaining experience from working at Biamax, Scavas started his first car design in 1969, undertaking the entire vehicle development. Scavas 1, a sports car with a 1200cc NSU engine was introduced in 1973. Although the vehicle received a registration licence, there was no further production. His second model, the stylish Scavas 2 was designed in 1992 with the intention of series production. Again, even though the car received a registration licence (and used by Scavas himself), for bureaucratic reasons, no permit for further production was awarded by the state. Scavas 3 of 1996 remained a design.

References 
 L.S. Skartsis and G.A. Avramidis, "Made in Greece", Typorama, Patras, Greece (2003)  (republished by the University of Patras Science Park, 2007)
L.S. Skartsis, "Greek Vehicle & Machine Manufacturers 1800 to present: A Pictorial History", Marathon (2012)  (eBook)
 E. Roupa and E. Hekimoglou, "I istoria tou aftokinitou stin Ellada (History of automobile in Greece)", Kerkyra - Economia publishing, Athens (2009) 
 "35 Years 4 Trohoi" (collectible edition of the 4 Trohoi auto magazine), Technical Press, Athens (2004)

External links 
 Dutch auto catalog

Car manufacturers of Greece
Cars of Greece